Derek Woodman was a British former Grand Prix motorcycle road racer. His best season was in  when he rode an MZ to finish the year in third place in the 125cc world championship, behind Hugh Anderson and Frank Perris. In 1964, he teamed with Brian Setchell to win the Thruxton 500 endurance race.

References

External links
 Derek Woodman Isle of Man TT results at iomtt.com

Further reading

MZ - the racers, by Jan Leek, 650 Publications, 1991, 
MZ, by Mick Walker, Redline Books, 2004, 

Year of birth missing (living people)
Living people
People from Blackpool
English motorcycle racers
125cc World Championship riders
250cc World Championship riders
350cc World Championship riders
500cc World Championship riders
Isle of Man TT riders